In computer science, a maximal pair within a string is a pair of matching substrings that are maximal, where "maximal" means that it is not possible to make a longer matching pair by extending the range of both substrings to the left or right.

Example 

For example, in this table, the substrings at indices 2 to 4 (in red) and indices 6 to 8 (in blue) are a maximal pair, because they contain identical characters (abc), and they have different characters to the left (x at index 1 and y at index 5) and different characters to the right (y at index 5 and w at index 9). Similarly, the substrings at indices 6 to 8 (in blue) and indices 10 to 12 (in green) are a maximal pair.

However, the substrings at indices 2 to 4 (in red) and indices 10 to 12 (in green) are not a maximal pair, as the character y follows both substrings, and so they can be extended to the right to make a longer pair.

Formal definition 

Related concepts and time complexity 

A maximal repeat is the string represented by a maximal pair. A supermaximal repeat is a maximal repeat never occurring as a proper substring of another maximal repeat. In the above example, abc and abcy are both maximal repeats, but only abcy is a supermaximal repeat.

Maximal pairs, maximal repeats and supermaximal repeats can each be found in  time using a suffix tree, if there are  such structures.

References

External links 
Project for the computation of all maximal repeats in one ore more strings in Python, using suffix array.

String (computer science)
Formal languages